Lilies of the Field (also known as Betty in Mayfair) is a 1934 British romantic comedy film directed by Norman Walker and starring Winifred Shotter, Ellis Jeffreys, Anthony Bushell and Claude Hulbert. It was made at British and Dominion Elstree Studios.

Cast
 Winifred Shotter as Betty Beverley
 Ellis Jeffreys as Mrs Carmichael
 Anthony Bushell as Guy Mallory
 Claude Hulbert as Bryan Rigby
 Judy Gunn as Kitty Beverley
 Jack Raine as George Belwood
 Bobbie Comber as Withers
 Hubert Harben as Reverend John Beverley
 Maud Gill as Mrs Beverley
 Toni Edgar-Bruce as Lady Rocker
 Gladys Jennings as Monica Flane

References

Bibliography
 Low, Rachael. Filmmaking in 1930s Britain. George Allen & Unwin, 1985.
 Wood, Linda. British Films, 1927-1939. British Film Institute, 1986.

External links
 

1934 films
1934 romantic comedy films
British romantic comedy films
1930s English-language films
Films directed by Norman Walker
Films set in England
British black-and-white films
British and Dominions Studios films
Films shot at Imperial Studios, Elstree
1930s British films